Malika Mezzane is a Moroccan poet, a writer, and a Berber rights activist.

Career 
Mezzane studied in Fez where she earned a BA degree in philosophy from Sidi Mohamed Ben Abdellah University. She is a former Philosophy teacher. She has published 17 works in 22 publications, in 2 languages. In 1992 she travelled to Switzerland, where she resided for nine years until 2001, during which time she devoted herself to writing on a regular basis, committed to defending human rights in general and those of Maghrebi immigrants in particular. She is considered by many the Berber ambassador to the Kurdish People, especially after she met the president of Kurdistan, Masoud Barzani, in July 2018. She is also a supporter of the state of Israel and has been outspoken on their right to be in "their homeland".

Publications

Poetry 
Mezzane has written several collections of poems in Arabic:

 Geneva, the other maze (2004)
 If only I could forgive this world (2005)
 If my exile is completed in you (2005)
 When the dead promised us (2006)

Novels 
In 2019, she wrote her first novel "ما أصعب ألا أراك", in which she supports the unification of the Kurds under a single state.

References 

Berber activists
Moroccan writers
Living people
1960 births